The Order of Distinction is an Order of Merit of Belize. It is a single rank order with sash and breast star. Recipients are entiled to the postnominals "ODB".

References

Orders, decorations, and medals of Belize

1991 establishments in Belize
Awards established in 1991